Michael Thorpe Williams (born 23 March 1947, in Manchester) was a British ice skater who competed in men's singles.  He won the gold medal at the British Figure Skating Championships in 1967 and 1968 and finished 15th at the 1968 Winter Olympics.

References
 Sports-reference profile

British male single skaters
English male single skaters
1947 births
Olympic figure skaters of Great Britain
Figure skaters at the 1968 Winter Olympics
Living people
Sportspeople from Manchester